Jeremy Jon Ware (born October 23, 1975) is a Canadian former professional baseball left fielder.

Career
He was drafted by the Montreal Expos in 1994 Major League Baseball draft in the 25th round, 700th overall.

Ware formerly played for the Edmonton Trappers until the team was sold to a group of investors including baseball legend Nolan Ryan, which later moved the team to Round Rock, Texas, where they are now known as the Round Rock Express.

He played with the 2008 Ottawa Rapids and 2009 Ottawa Rapidz of the CanAm League and was a member of the fourth-place Team Canada at the 2004 Summer Olympics.

He later played with the Kitchener Panthers of the Ontario Intercounty Baseball League.

References

1975 births
Living people
Baseball outfielders
Baseball people from Ontario
Baseball players at the 1999 Pan American Games
Baseball players at the 2004 Summer Olympics
Buffalo Bisons (minor league) players
Canadian expatriate baseball players in the United States
Cape Fear Crocs players
Edmonton Trappers players
Harrisburg Senators players
Jupiter Hammerheads players
Olympic baseball players of Canada
Ottawa Lynx players
Pan American Games bronze medalists for Canada
Pan American Games medalists in baseball
People from Orangeville, Ontario
Vermont Expos players
Medalists at the 1999 Pan American Games

it:Jeremy Ware